A. lignicola  may refer to:
 Ascominuta lignicola, a fungus species
 Amylolepiota lignicola, a fungus species
 Andricus lignicola, a gall forming wasp species

See also
 Lignicola